Cabin Creek Ranch, on Cabin Creek at its confluence with Big Creek in the Payette National Forest, near Black Butte, Idaho, was listed on the National Register of Historic Places in 1990.

Year of construction: 1894
Historic function: Domestic; Agriculture/subsistence
Historic subfunction: Single Dwelling; Agricultural Outbuildings; Agricultural Fields; Animal Facility; Secondary Structure
Criteria: event, information potential

References

Ranches in the United States
National Register of Historic Places in Valley County, Idaho
Buildings and structures completed in 1894